The postal strike controversy in Finland in late 2019 saw widespread trade union protests which later resulted in the resignation of Prime Minister Antti Rinne and the resignation of his cabinet. In November 2019, Rinne and local government minister Sirpa Paatero were accused of giving misinformation, specifically about the transfer of work-contracts of 700 Posti (Finland's state owned postal service) package handlers, which would result in lower pay. The strike led to a one-day sympathy strike by Finland's transport sector, which had to cancel 300 flights. Gradually it transformed into a trade-union solidarity protest in the country. It ultimately led to the resignation of Prime Minister Rinne, when the Centre Party withdrew its support from his cabinet.

Background
Labor unions in Finland have been traditionally strong, but they have been angered by the competitiveness pact, which increased working hours three days a year without pay rise between 2016 and 2019. The deal was negotiated in 2019, to help Finland recover from recession. The center-left government, elected in 2019, was considered more favorable to employee concerns. However, a decision by Prime Minister Antti Rinne to shift 700 Posti workers from packaging and e-commerce into a collective bargaining unit prompted widespread protests from postal workers.

The strike

In response, the postal and logistics union went into strike on November 11. 14 days later, solidarity protests from unions in other industries shut the nation down. Despite disruption in daily lives, 60 percent of Finns supported the move. Two days later, the postal workers reached an agreement with the government. Both parties settled that the 700 workers will return to the previous collective employee-employer agreement, and workers will return to their work.

Aftermath

In wake of the crisis, the Center Party said that it had lost confidence in Rinne, and Rinne handed over his resignation to president Sauli Niinistö. Sanna Marin, a Social Democratic Party member, was appointed prime minister following his resignation.

References

2019 in Finland
Postal strikes
Controversies in Europe
2019 controversies
2019 protests